A constitutional referendum was held in Palau on 4 August 1987. The changes to the constitution would lower the threshold of the majority required for approving the Compact of Free Association with the United States from 75%, after five previous referendums had approved the Compact, but not by the majority required. 

Although the referendum saw 73.3% of voters vote in favour of the amendments, the referendum was later declared void by the Supreme Court as the enabling legislation had not achieved the 75% majority required in the House of Delegates or Senate.

Results

References

1987 referendums
1987 in Palau
Referendums in Palau
Constitutional referendums in Palau